Muhammad Ibrahim (known as Justice M Ibrahim; September 1894 – 13 October 1966) was a Bengali judge and academic. He served as the 8th Vice-chancellor of the University of Dhaka during 1956–1958.

Early life and education

Ibrahim was born in September 1894 in Shaildubi village of Sadarpur Upazila in Faridpur District to Ghiyasuddin Ahmed. Ibrahim passed matriculation exam from Barisal Zilla School and intermediate exam from Dhaka College in 1916 and 1918 respectively. He completed his bachelor's in English literature. He then studied Law under the persuasion of Nares Chandra Sen-Gupta. He earned a law degree in 1921.

Career
Ibrahim practiced law at Faridpur during 1922–1923, and joined the Dhaka District Bar in 1924. He also served as a part-time teacher at the University of Dhaka from 1924 until 1943. He became a Public Prosecutor in the Dhaka District Court in 1939. He was appointed an Additional District and Sessions Judge in 1943. In 1950, he was elevated to Dhaka High Court Bench. He retired as a High Court Judge in 1956.

He served as the Chairman of the Election Tribunal and later served as the Vice-Chancellor of the University of Dhaka from November 1956 until October 1958.

He was appointed the Minister of Law by Pakistani President Ayub Khan and served the position during 1958–1962.

Personal life
Ibrahim was married to Lutfuennessa Ibrahim. Together they had a daughter Sufia Ahmed, a National Professor of Bangladesh.

References

1894 births
1966 deaths
People from Faridpur District
Dhaka College alumni
Academic staff of the University of Dhaka
Vice-Chancellors of the University of Dhaka
Law Ministers of Pakistan
Pakistani judges
Bengali lawyers